This is a list of all versions of the Zune software that were released.

The 1.0 versions of the Zune software were a modified version of Windows Media Player 11 while versions since 2.0 are built independently with additional DirectShow decoders for AAC, MPEG-4, and H.264. The current version of the software is 4.8.2345.0 released on August 22, 2011.  Several versions of the software have been released.

<div>

References

Zune
Software version histories